Graduate School of Biomedical Sciences may refer to:
Texas A&M University Graduate School of Biomedical Sciences in College Station, Texas
Rutgers University Graduate School of Biomedical Sciences in Newark, New Jersey
Rowan University Graduate School of Biomedical Sciences in Stratford, New Jersey
Graduate School of Biomedical Sciences in Galveston, Texas
UNT Graduate School of Biomedical Sciences in Fort Worth, Texas